Techi Tahin (born 9 June 1991) is an Indian cricketer. He made his first-class debut for Arunachal Pradesh in the 2018–19 Ranji Trophy on 12 November 2018.

References

External links
 

1991 births
Living people
Indian cricketers
Arunachal Pradesh cricketers
Place of birth missing (living people)